The 2022 season was the 97th season in the existence of Barcelona Sporting Club, and the 64th season in the top flight of Ecuadorian football. Barcelona was involved in four competitions: the main national tournament Liga Pro, the national cup called Copa Ecuador, and two international tournaments: Copa Libertadores and Copa Sudamericana.

This season is the third one with Carlos Alfaro Moreno as president of the club. Fabián Bustos started the season as coach but departed to replace Fábio Carille at Santos FC at which point he was replaced by Jorge Célico. After a poor run of form in the season's second stage, Bustos returned to replaced Célico.

Competitions

LigaPro Serie A

First stage

Standings

Results summary

Results by round

Matches

Second stage

Standings

Results summary

Results by round

Matches

Final stage 

Barcelona met second-stage winners Aucas in the season-long Serie A final which was played over two legs.

Aucas won 1–0 on aggregate.

Copa Ecuador

Copa Libertadores

First qualifying stage 

Tied 1–1 on aggregate, Barcelona won on penalties and advanced to the second stage (Match C5).

Second qualifying stage 

Barcelona won 3–0 on aggregate and advanced to the third stage (Match G4).

Third qualifying stage 

Tied 0–0 on aggregate, América Mineiro won on penalties and advanced to the group stage.

Copa Sudamericana

Group stage (Group A)

Barcelona transferred to the Copa Sudamericana group stage after their elimination from the Copa Libertadores in the third qualifying round. The draw for the group stage was held on 25 March 2022, 12:00 PYST (UTC−4), at the CONMEBOL Convention Centre in Luque, Paraguay.

Statistics

Goalscorers

References

External links 
 

Barcelona S.C. seasons
2022 in Ecuadorian football